Caterina Boratto (15 March 1915 – 14 September 2010) was an Italian film actress. She appeared in 50 films between 1936 and 1993.

Life and career
Born in Turin, Boratto studied at the Musical Lyceum in her hometown with the purpose of becoming a singer; noted by Guido Brignone, she made her debut in To Live, alongside Tito Schipa. Thanks to the film's success, she immediately became a star in the Telefoni Bianchi genre, and also got a seven-year contract with Metro-Goldwyn-Mayer which eventually dissolved because of the World War II.

In 1943, Boratto lost two brothers, the partisan Renato and the soldier Filiberto, killed in the massacre of the Acqui Division. In 1944, she married a doctor, Armando Ceratto, with whom she had two children. Except for a film in 1951, she basically retired from show business for twenty years before accepting to play two key roles in 8½ and Juliet of the Spirits by Federico Fellini, who had known her in the set of The Peddler and the Lady, where he had served as screenwriter. Starting from the second half of the 1960s, Boratto resumed appearing in films with some regularity, and from the late 1970s, she also became very active on television, being cast in dozens of TV series.

Filmography

Further reading
 Paolo Ceratto; Franco Prono. Caterina Boratto: Una regalità completa. Daniela Piazza Editore, 2014. .
 Marina Ceratto. Caterina Boratto, la donna che visse tre volte. Edizioni Sabinae, 2016. .

References

External links

1915 births
2010 deaths
Italian film actresses
Actors from Turin
20th-century Italian actresses
Italian television actresses